Silke Möller ( Gladisch, born 20 June 1964) is a German athlete, who in the 1980s competed for East Germany as one of the best female sprinters in the world. She was a member of the East German quartet that broke the world record in the 4 × 100 m relay at the World cup in Canberra on 6 October 1985. She and teammates Sabine Rieger, Marlies Göhr, and Ingrid Auerswald ran a time of 41.37 seconds, which stood as the world record until 2012. She is the 1987 World champion at both 100 metres and 200 metres.

Biography
Moller was born in Stralsund, Bezirk Rostock (present-day Mecklenburg-Vorpommern). During her career she often stood in the shadows of Göhr, Marita Koch, and Heike Drechsler. Only in 1987, while still using her maiden name Gladisch, did she come into her own: at the track and field world championship of 1987 she won two titles – in the 100 m sprint and the 200 m sprint, as well as second place with the 4 × 100 m relay team. With these results she was chosen as the East German sportswoman of the year.

Möller's 200m final performance at Rome in 1987 was exceptionally fast, she stopped the clock at 21.74 seconds. She had won the race by several meters and defeated a world class field including Florence Griffith and Merlene Ottey. Her time of 21.74 seconds was only just outside the then world record of 21.71 held by Marita Koch and Heike Drechsler.

At the 1988 Summer Olympics in Seoul she won the silver medal as a member of the East German 4 × 100 m relay team (she had at that time taken the name Möller).

In 1992 she was implicated with Katrin Krabbe and Grit Breuer in a doping scandal, but was later cleared by the International Athletic Federation (IAAF). Shortly before the 1992 Summer Olympics she quit her athletic career and began to study history in Rostock. She worked as a history and sports teacher. She has a daughter.

Möller represented the Empor Rostock sport club and trained under Wolfgang Meier (Marita Koch's coach and now husband). While she was actively competing, she was 1.63 metres tall and weighed 57 kilograms.

Achievements

Other results
1981 Junior European champion in the 4 × 100 m relay (43.77 seconds)
1985 European Cup: winner in the 4 × 100 m relay
1987 European Cup winner in the 200 m and 4 × 100 m relay

See also

 German all-time top lists – 100 metres
 German all-time top lists – 200 metres

External links

1964 births
Living people
People from Stralsund
People from Bezirk Rostock
East German female sprinters
Sportspeople from Mecklenburg-Western Pomerania
Olympic athletes of East Germany
Athletes (track and field) at the 1988 Summer Olympics
Olympic silver medalists for East Germany
World Athletics Championships medalists
World Athletics Indoor Championships winners
European Athletics Championships medalists
Medalists at the 1988 Summer Olympics
Olympic silver medalists in athletics (track and field)
Recipients of the Patriotic Order of Merit in silver
World Athletics Championships winners
Olympic female sprinters